Aoede , also known as , is a natural satellite of Jupiter. It was discovered by a team of astronomers from the University of Hawaii led by Scott S. Sheppard in 2003. It received the temporary designation .

Aoede is about 4 kilometres in diameter, and orbits Jupiter at an average distance of 23,044,000 km in 714.657 days, at an inclination of 160° to the ecliptic (162° to Jupiter's equator), in a retrograde direction and with an eccentricity of 0.4311.

It was named in March 2005 after Aœde, one of the three original Muses. Aœde was the Muse of song, and was a daughter of Zeus (Jupiter) by Mnemosyne.

Aoede belongs to the Pasiphae group, irregular retrograde moons orbiting Jupiter at distances ranging between 22.8 and 24.1 Gm, and with inclinations ranging between 144.5° and 158.3°.

References

Moons of Jupiter
Discoveries by Scott S. Sheppard
Irregular satellites
Astronomical objects discovered in 2003
Pasiphae group
Moons with a retrograde orbit